Sanjay Ramasamy is an Indian politician and former Member of the Legislative Assembly. He was elected to the Tamil Nadu legislative assembly as an Indian Congress (Socialist) – Sarat Chandra Sinha candidate from Virudhunagar constituency in 1991 election. And now he has joined the BJP Tamil Nadu. He is the son of Justice V. Ramaswami, the former Supreme Court Judge and Chief Justice of Chandgarh High Court, who was the first to be put up for removal from the bench.

He married Srilatha Yanger, sister of actress Sridevi.

References 

Indian National Congress politicians from Tamil Nadu
Living people
Year of birth missing (living people)
Tamil Nadu MLAs 1991–1996
Indian Congress (Socialist) politicians